Silverhill is a town in Baldwin County, Alabama, United States. As of the 2010 census, the population was 706. It is part of the Daphne-Fairhope-Foley metropolitan area.

Geography
Alabama State Route 104 (Silverhill Avenue) runs through the center of the town, connecting Robertsdale to the east with Fairhope to the west.

Demographics

As of the census of 2000, there were 616 people, 241 households, and 178 families residing in the town. The racial makeup of the town was 98.05% White, 0.16% Native American, 0.65% Asian, and 1.14% from two or more races. 1.46% of the population were Hispanic or Latino of any race. 24.8% were of American, 14.8% German, 10.2% Swedish, 9.0% English and 6.4% Irish ancestry according to Census 2000.

There were 241 households, out of which 32.4% had children under the age of 18 living with them, 61.8% were married couples living together, 8.7% had a female householder with no husband present, and 26.1% were non-families. 20.7% of all households were made up of individuals, and 10.4% had someone living alone who was 65 years of age or older. The average household size was 2.54 and the average family size was 2.97.

In the town, the population was spread out, with 25.2% under the age of 18, 6.5% from 18 to 24, 25.8% from 25 to 44, 26.3% from 45 to 64, and 16.2% who were 65 years of age or older. The median age was 40 years. For every 100 females, there were 91.3 males. For every 100 females age 18 and over, there were 88.2 males.

The median income for a household in the town was $42,083, and the median income for a family was $51,964. Males had a median income of $30,417 versus $25,938 for females. The per capita income for the town was $20,723. About 3.8% of families and 4.8% of the population were below the poverty line, including 4.6% of those under age 18 and 5.1% of those age 65 or over.

History
Silverhill was founded in 1897 by Oscar Johnson, C. O. Carlson and C. A. Valentin of Chicago, Illinois. Oscar Johnson was an immigrant from Dalarna, Sweden. The Svea Land Company in Chicago, which advertised land for sale in Silverhill, was founded by Oscar Johnson. Land was acquired by purchase from a Mr. Harford, the first block of land being , which was added to from time to time as the colonization work progressed. Scandinavian settlers came to Silverhill from virtually every state in the Union and began the development of what is now the Silverhill district.

Education 
Silverhill is a part of the Baldwin County Public Schools system. Silverhill has one school, Silverhill Elementary School, which serves grades kindergarten through 6. Silverhill students continue on to Central Baldwin Middle School (7-8) and Robertsdale High School (9-12), both of which are in Robertsdale.

Gallery

See also
Central Baldwin

References

External links
 Baldwin County Express, historical society located near Silverhill

Towns in Alabama
Towns in Baldwin County, Alabama
Populated places established in 1897
Swedish migration to North America
Swedish-American culture in Alabama